The Football Superleague of Kosovo, also known as the ALBI MALL Superleague of Kosovo for sponsorship reasons with Albi Mall, is the top level of the Kosovar football league system. The Superleague is organized by the Football Federation of Kosovo and the division currently has a 10-team format. The clubs play each other four times during the season for a 36-match schedule. At the end of the season, the bottom two teams in the division are relegated to the second tier, First Football League of Kosovo.

The Superleague ran outside FIFA and UEFA until Kosovo was admitted to both organizations, on 3 May 2016.

History 

Prior to World War II, within Kingdom of Yugoslavia, Kosovan clubs competed in the provincial leagues of the Belgrade Football Subassociation. During World War II, between 1941 and 1944, when most of the region became part of the Albanian Kingdom, numerous Kosovan clubs played in the Albanian league system. In 1945, Kosovo was reincorporated to Serbia, and subsequently, into the SFR Yugoslavia. The league has its origins in 1945 when it became one of the subdivisions of the 5th level in the Yugoslav football league system. It gathered the best clubs from the SAP Kosovo except for those clubs competing in higher levels. In 1991, an unrecognised parallel league gathering ethnic Albanian pro-independence clubs was set, and was run till 1999. In the meantime, the best clubs competed in the leagues of FR Yugoslavia. In 1999, after the Kosovo War, a separate Kosovar league system was formed. It included most clubs from Kosovo except those from Serbian-dominated North Kosovo which remained in the Serbian football league system. Since 2000, the competition has been running continuously, and by 2017, after Kosovo gained membership in FIFA and UEFA, began acting as the national league of Kosovo, providing clubs for international tournaments.

Names

Previous winners 
This is a list of winners of Football Superleague of Kosovo since 1945.

Clubs (2022–23)

Seasons in Football Superleague of Kosovo 
There are 34 teams that have taken part in the Football Super league of Kosovo since 1999. Prishtina is the only team that has played in every season since 1999. As of 2022/23 season.

Titles by club 
Number of titles since Independent League of Kosovo became the first tier of Kosovar league system.

UEFA rankings

Kosovo football clubs in European competitions

Notes and references

Notes

References

External links 
  
 Football Superleague of Kosovo summary - Soccerway

 
Top level
Kosovo
Sports leagues established in 1945
1945 establishments in Kosovo